NGC 411 is a globular cluster located approximately  from Earth in the constellation Tucana. It was discovered in 1826 by James Dunlop. It was described by Dreyer as "extremely faint, pretty large, round, gradually very little brighter middle." At a distance of about 180,000 light years (55,000 parsecs), it is located within the Small Magellanic Cloud.

NGC 411 was imaged by the Hubble Space Telescope in 2013, showing an abundance of stars ranging from blue to red. In particular, this seemed to suggest that the cluster was much younger than previously thought: its age has been estimated at about 1.5 billion years old, relatively young in astronomical terms. However, these results have been challenged by another group who state that these young stars may actually just be background stars, and are thus physically unrelated.

References

External links
 

0411
Astronomical objects discovered in 1826
Tucana (constellation)
Open clusters
Small Magellanic Cloud